Raymond Kelly, S.P.S. (born 25 April 1953) is an Irish Catholic priest known for his interpretation of popular songs. He is the priest of St. Brigid′s & St. Mary′s parish at Oldcastle, County Meath, Ireland, and a member of Saint Patrick’s Society for the Foreign Missions.
He was on dancing with the stars with Kylee Vincent. He has a very large family and he sang at many of his relatives and inlaws weddings.

Early life and priesthood

Kelly was born on 25 April 1953 in Tyrrellspass, County Westmeath, and began singing when he was young. In 1989, he was ordained as a priest and began his vocation.

Music career
Kelly became famous in 2014 after a video of him singing Leonard Cohen's song "Hallelujah" while officiating at a couple's wedding became a YouTube sensation. The words were modified to suit the occasion by 10-year-old bridesmaid Lucy Pitts O'Connor. By 2020, it had received more than 75 million hits.

In December 2014 Universal Music released a 10-track album Where I Belong of Kelly singing Celtic-inspired arrangements. The album was recorded during summer 2014 in a studio created for the purpose in Kelly's house, so that the recording schedule would not interfere with his duties as a priest. In December 2015 Kelly was a guest on the BBC Radio 4 programme Midweek.

Television appearances
In 2018 Kelly auditioned for the 12th series of Britain's Got Talent, singing "Everybody Hurts" by R.E.M. He made it to the live shows but he was eliminated in semifinal 5. He came fourth in the public voting.

In 2020, he took part in the fourth season of the Irish edition of Dancing with the Stars. He and his professional partner, Kylee Vincent, were eliminated on 8 March 2020.

Discography

Albums 
 Where I Belong (2014)
 An Irish Christmas Blessing (2015)

Books

References

External links 
 Official website
 Kelly's original YouTube video

Living people
1953 births
Britain's Got Talent contestants
20th-century Irish Roman Catholic priests
Musicians from County Westmeath
21st-century Irish Roman Catholic priests